Tresidder is a surname. Notable people with the surname include:

Donald Tresidder (1894–1948), American academic administrator
Ernest Tresidder (1875–1951), Australian politician
John Tresidder Sheppard (1881–1968), English classicist